This is a list of Colombian artists. Colombian art has 3,500 years of history and covers a wide range of media and styles ranging from Quimbaya gold craftwork and Spanish Baroque devotional painting to modern Colombian cinema and conceptual art movements.

A
Julio Abril, Sculptor and painter
Olga de Amaral, Textiles
Débora Arango, Painter
Rodrigo Arenas, Sculptor

B
Fernando Botero, Painter and sculptor

C
Antonio Caro, Painter and mixed media artist
Gregorio Vasquez de Arce y Ceballos, Painter
Olga de Chica, Primitivist painter
Juan Fernando Cobo Painter and sculptor
Antonio Acero de la Cruz (c1600–1668), Painter and poet
Claudia Cuesta, Installation artist

D
Danilo Dueñas, Painter

E
Juan Manuel Echavarría, Video and photography
Jesus Maria Espinosa, Painter
Miguel de la Espriella, Painter and sculptor

F
Pedro José Figueroa, portrait painter

G
Alberto Gómez Gómez, Muralist, painter and printmaker
Miguel Gómez, Photographer
Pedro Nel Gómez, Muralist
Beatriz Gonzalez, Painter and sculptor
Nadia Granados, Performance artist
Enrique Grau, Painter

J
Edgar Francisko Jimenez, Painter

L
Ledania (street artist)

M
Adriana Marmorek, Multimedia Artist
Santiago Martinez Delgado, Muralist
Leo Matiz, Photographer
Oscar Murillo, Painter
Sara Modiano, Multimedia Artist

N
Edgar Negret, Painter
Alonso Neira Martinez, Sculptor

O
Alejandro Obregon, Painter
Mario Opazo, video and performance artist 
Nadín Ospina, Artist
Gloria Ortiz-Hernandez, artist

R
Eduardo Ramírez Villamizar, Painter and sculptor
Omar Rayo, Painter and sculptor
Pedro Restrepo, Painter
Ruby Rumié, Contemporary artist
Pedro Ruiz, Painter and Conceptual Artist

S
Doris Salcedo, Conceptual artist
Andrés de Santa Maria, Painter
Viviana Spinosa Contemporary artist

U
Federico Uribe, Mixed media artist

See also 
List of Colombian musicians
List of Colombian writers

References

External links
  – Web Directory of Artists and Cultural institutions from Colombia
 Colombian Artists (Painters and Plastic Artists) and Current Art Events in Colombia Latin American Art from Colombia

Artists
 
Colombian